Steve or Stephen Masters may refer to:

 Stephen Masters (cricketer), English cricketer who flourished in the 1810s
 Stephen Masters (rower) (born 1969), Danish lightweight rower
 Steve Masters (DJ), American radio and club DJ